The Eugene Marathon, is a marathon established in 2007, which takes place in Eugene, Oregon. The main event is accompanied by a half marathon, 5K and kids run.  The marathon is certified by the USATF, and is a qualifying event for both the Boston Marathon and the United States Olympic Trials.  The event features live music performed along the marathon and half-marathon routes, and at the finish as well.

The tagline for the event is "Running in the Footsteps of Legends" in honor of the Eugene area's history in the sport, as well as the University of Oregon's tradition of producing great runners.

History 
The marathon, established in 2007, was the first major marathon to be held in Eugene since 1984, when the last Nike OTC Marathon was staged.  Nearly 5000 entrants participated in the inaugural 2007 marathon events, which featured about thirty elite athletes, many of whom were shooting for qualifying marks for the US Olympic Trials, which were held in New York City in November.

The Eugene area regularly hosts track and field championship events, which in the past have included several National Collegiate Athletic Association track championships and US Olympic Marathon Trials in 1972, 1976 and 1980. In 2021, Eugene will be the first city in the United States to host the International Association of Athletics Federation's 2021 World Championships in Athletics, which is billed as the world's largest sporting event in 2021.

The 2020 edition of the race was cancelled due to the coronavirus pandemic, with registrants having the option of transferring their registration to 2021 or 2022 for free.

Course

The Eugene Marathon traverses the regulation  marathon distance, and is certified by USA Track and Field, the sport's governing body in the US.

The course is laid out primarily on city streets and bike paths along the Willamette River, following many of the roads and trails used by Oregon's significant runners, such as Steve Prefontaine, Alberto Salazar, Bill McChesney and Mary Decker Slaney.

The Eugene Marathon had previously begun in front of Hayward Field on the University of Oregon campus, but as of 2019 Hayward Field is under construction in preparation for the IAAF's 2021 World Championships in Athletics. The marathon currently begins instead at Autzen Stadium. Runners cross the Willamette River and go through downtown and the campus area, then down past South Eugene High School and through Amazon Park. They continue into the edge of the South Hills, then turn back north and eventually get on the riverfront trail system. From here they make a loop that travels through the River Road neighborhood and then across the Owosso Drive footbridge to the Delta Ponds area, Alton Baker Park, and eventually east to Springfield before circling back to finish at Autzen Stadium.

The marathon is a Boston Marathon and US Olympic Marathon Trials qualifier event, and its certification allows record breaking performances to qualify as new world records.

Community impact 

Proceeds from the event benefit various community causes such as CASA of Lane County, American Cancer Society, the Lane County food bank, Pre's Trail, and others.

Winners

Leadership
 Founder/Principle: Andy Heily
 Executive Race Director: Courtney Heily
 Race Director: Ian Dobson
 Director of Event Operations: Becky Radliff
 Marketing and Content Coordinator: Jon Marx

References

External links
 EugeneMarathon.com - Official website
 MarathonGuide.com - 'Eugene Marathon & Half Marathon, 5K, Kids Run - Eugene, OR USA'
 OregonLive.com - ' Eugene Marathon to honor city's past', Doug Binder, The Oregonian (January 8, 2007)
 RunnerSpace.com - Fan site with Highlight video and start/finish videos

Recurring sporting events established in 2007
Marathons in the United States
Sports in Eugene, Oregon
Sports competitions in Oregon
2007 establishments in Oregon
Annual events in Eugene, Oregon